Percival Edmund Steele (26 December 1923 – 21 October 2009) was an English footballer who played as a full back for Carlton, Tranmere Rovers and Burscough. He made 328 appearances for Tranmere. He also guested for Dundee United during January 1946.

References

1923 births
2009 deaths
Footballers from Liverpool
Association football fullbacks
English footballers
Tranmere Rovers F.C. players
Burscough F.C. players
English Football League players
Dundee United F.C. wartime guest players